The Second Hurricane is an opera in two acts by Aaron Copland to a libretto by Edwin Denby. Specifically written for school performances, it lasts just under an hour and premiered on April 21, 1937, at the Henry Street Settlement playhouse in New York City. Set in the United States in the 1930s, the opera tells the story of a group of high school students who become trapped on an island while working to rescue the victims of a hurricane.

Background and performance history
The Second Hurricane was Copland's first attempt at composing opera and was commissioned by the Henry Street Settlement in New York City where it premiered on April 21, 1937, at the settlement's playhouse performed by students at its music school. The premiere production was designed by Orson Welles and conducted by Lehman Engel. The young Joseph Cotten played the small speaking role of Mr. Maclenahan.

The work was performed on CBS Radio May 9, 1937, in a one-hour broadcast directed by Earle McGill.

The work has only been sporadically performed since its premiere. During a weeklong celebration of Copland's 80th birthday in 1980, it was performed one night at Memphis State University with students from the Memphis Public Schools, directed by Robert Swift. In honor of Copland's 85th birthday, it was revived at the Henry Street Settlement in November 1985 in a production by Tazewell Thompson which restored an aria and a ballet which had been cut from the work at its premiere. On the 100th anniversary of his birth, a new version was premiered at the 11th Chicago Humanities Festival. For the Chicago production the producer and musical director Michael Barrett and Jamie Bernstein Thomas (the daughter of Leonard Bernstein) wrote a new libretto updating the story from the 1930s to 2000 with the action taking place in a television studio where the protagonists describe their adventures for a cable-television show called Teen Heroes. In 2014, the opera was revived in Columbia, South Carolina as a co-production between the University of South Carolina's Magellan scholar program, Opera at USC, FBN Productions, Inc., and Columbia Music Festival Association. The cast was composed of community students from across the Midlands region of South Carolina and was directed by University of South Carolina senior Kate McKinney.

Roles

Recording
In the Beginning / The Second Hurricane – New York High School of Music & Art soloists and chorus, New York Philharmonic Orchestra conducted by Leonard Bernstein. Label: Sony 60560

Notes and references

Sources
Boosey & Hawkes. Copland, Aaron, The Second Hurricane (1936). Retrieved 11 January 2012.
Copland, Aaron and Kostelanetz Richard (ed.) (2004).  Aaron Copland: A Reader: Selected Writings 1923–1972. Routledge. 
Crist, Elizabeth Bergman (2009). Music for the Common Man: Aaron Copland During the Depression and War. Oxford University Press. 
France, Richard (1977). The Theatre of Orson Welles. Bucknell University Press. 
New York Times (8 April 1937) "Lead Roles Filled in Juvenile Opera, World Premiere of 'Second Hurricane' To Be Held Here on 21 April". Retrieved 11 January 2012 .
New York Times (22 April 1937). "'Second Hurricane' in World Premiere". Retrieved 13 January 2012.
Pollack, Howard (2000). Aaron Copland: The Life and Work of an Uncommon Man. University of Illinois Press. 
Rockwell, John (15 November 1985). "Copland's 'Second Hurricane'". New York Times. Retrieved 11 January 2012.
Von Rhein, John (12 November 2000). "Aaron Copland's 'The Second Hurricane' at the Francis W. Parker School". Chicago Tribune. Retrieved 11 January 2012.

Operas by Aaron Copland
English-language operas
Operas
1937 operas
Operas set in the United States